Bufotes pseudoraddei (Batura toad, Batura Glacier toad, or Swat green toad) is a species of toad in the family Bufonidae. It is found in the West Himalayan region, including northern Pakistan and the border area between western Xizang of China and adjacent northwestern India. Its natural habitats are temperate forests, intermittent freshwater marshes, arable land, pastureland, plantations, and rural gardens.

References

 STÖCK M., M. SCHMID, C. STEINLEIN AND W.-R. GROSSE (1999). Mosaicism in somatic triploid specimens of the Bufo viridis complex in the Karakoram with examination of calls, morphology and taxonomic conclusions. Ital. J. Zool. (Modena) 66 (3): 215–232.
 STÖCK M., D. FRYNTA, W.-R. GROSSE, C. STEINLEIN, M. SCHMID (2001). A review of the distribution of diploid, triploid and tetraploid green toads (Bufo viridis complex) in Asia including new data from Iran and Pakistan. Asiatic Herp. Res. (Berkeley) 9: 77–100.
 STÖCK M., R. GÜNTHER AND W. BÖHME (2001). Progress towards a taxonomic revision of the Asian Bufo viridis group: Current status of nominal taxa and unsolved problems (Amphibia: Anura: Bufonidae). Zool. Abh. Staatl. Mus. Tierkunde Dresden. 51: 253–319.
 STÖCK M., MORITZ C., HICKERSON M., FRYNTA D., DUJSEBAYEVA T., EREMCHENKO V., MACEY J.R., PAPENFUSS T. J., AND WAKE D. B. (2006). Evolution of mitochondrial relationships and biogeography of Palearctic green toads (Bufo viridis subgroup) with insights in their genomic plasticity. Molecular Phylogenetics and Evolution. 41:663-689.

Amphibians of Pakistan
pseudoraddei
Amphibians described in 1971
Taxonomy articles created by Polbot